Smaro Stefanidou (9 April 1913 – 7 November 2010) was a Greek theatre, film, television and radio actress.

Biography 
Her family's origin is from Asia Minor.  She graduated from Business School in Athens, she learned foreign languages and the piano. From a very young age she presented plays for children. Without telling her parents, she worked to pay for her tuition at the National Theatre Drama School, as her parents didn't want her to become an actress.

After her graduation from the Drama School, in 1937, she was hired by the top theatre star of these times, Marika Kotopouli. Since 1952 she was the main character actress in the company of Vassilis Logothetidis, with whom she stayed until his death, in 1960.

She also she acted alongside Katerina, Elli Lampeti, Dimitris Horn, Lambros Konstantaras, Giannis Fertis, Xenia Kalogeropoulou, Aliki Vougiouklaki, Stefanos Lineos, Giannis Gkionakis, Nikos Kourkoulos, Antonis Antypas and many more.

A bright point in her career was her rendition of queen Hecuba in the play Trojan Women by Euripides translated and directed by Giannis Tsarouchis at a makeshift theatre on Kaplanon Street and in Delphi  At the "Tsarouhis Academy", as she playfully called it, she learned a lot from the charismatic artist.

She made her first cinema appearance in 1951, with G. Zervos' film "Four steps". Since then, she appeared in many movies, among which adaptations of theatre plays in which she had played. She also worked a lot for the radio, taking part in radio serials, radio theatre and readings of novels.

She married singer - chansonnier Vassos Seitanidis (1913–1965) Their daughter, Leda - Irene, now known as Leda Shantala, is a yoga teacher, Bharata natyam dancer/teacher/choreographer and dance therapist.

In autumn 2003 Smaro Stefanidou and her daughter created the "Shantom House of Culture", in Chalandri (a suburb of Athens), a centre hosting lessons, workshops and seminars (dance, yoga, martial arts, theatre, alternative therapies etc...) as well as performances.
She died in 2010, at the age of 97, and is buried in the First Cemetery.

Theatre

1937–1940: Marika Kotopouli Company
Angelos Terzakis Gamilio emvatirio (Wedding March)
Alfred Gehri 6th floor
Arnaud d'Usseau - Gau Deep are the roots
George Bernard Shaw Mrs Warren's profession
Dimitris Bogris Kainourgia zoi (New Life)
Dimitris Bogris Everything will change ... Mrs Asprodonti
Andre Aube Don Juan
Pandelis Horn Meltemaki (Light breeze)
Sophokles Electra ... chorus leader

1940–1942: Katerina Andreadi Company
Yalamas - Oekonomidis - Thisvios War quadrilles
Hayermann Good faith
S. Bekefy Come on the first of the month

1942–1944: Art Theatre
Henrik Ibsen The Wild Duck
August Strindberg Swanevit
G. Sevastikoglou Konstantine and Helene
Luigi Pirandello Right You Are (if you think so)
Erkin Cauldwell For a piece of land
Gregorios Xenopoulos Stella Violandi ... Stella's mother, Maria Violandi

1944: Katerina Andreadi Company
Victorien Sardou Madame Sans-Gêne
Leo Lentz Lady I love you

1946: United Artists Troupe
Theodora
If you work, you'll eat

1949–50: Vasso Manolidou - Y. Pappas Company

1952–1960: Vassilis Logothetidis Company
Sakellarios - Yannakopoulos Despinis eton 39 (An old maid of 39)
Yorgos Roussos Ena votsalo sti limni (A Pebble in the Lake),
Sakellarios - Yannakopoulos Triti kai dekatris (Tuesday and the 13th,
Dimitris Psathas Enas vlakas kai misos (A very stupid fellow),
Yorgos Tzavellas O erastis erchetai (The Lover is Coming)
Ernest-Aimé Feydeau A beating on the bottom
Nikos Tsiforos O teleftaios timios (The Last Honest Man)

1960–1962: Dimitris Horn Company
McDougall - Alan The coward and the bold
Sakellarios - Yannakopoulos Woe to the young
Jean Anouilh Le Voyageur sans bagage

1962–63
In the summer of 1962 she took part in the musical play by Bost - Mikis Theodorakis Omorfi poli (Beautiful City) (Park Theatre)
In the winter of 1962–63 she appeared again with Dimitris Horn in the plays
Georges Neveux What is Zamor
Marc Camoletti Girls up in the air
Immediately after, with the Lambros Konstandaras Company in the plays
Yorgos Roussos Karre tis damas (Carre of Queens) (with Vylma Kyrou and Lambros Konstandaras)
W. Somerset Maugham Rain (with L. Konstandaras and Maro Kontou)

1964–67: Various troupes
1964–65 Neil Simon Barefoot in the Park (Elli Lambeti Company)
1964–65 Tennessee Williams A Streetcar Named Desire (Elli Lambeti Company)
1965 Pretenderis - Yalamas Mias pendaras niata (Threepenny Youth) (during the summer season at the Minoa Theatre, and in the winter season at the Amiral Theatre)... Marika
1966 Yalamas - Pretenderis I komissa tis fabrikas (The Countess of the Factory) (Kondou - Linaios - Rizos - Stefanidou Company)
1967 Dimitris Psathas Achortagos (The Insatiable) (Yannis Gionakis - Christina Silva - Yannis Michalopoulos - Smaro Stefanidou company) at the Alhambra Theatre
1967 Yorgos Roussos Exi fores tin evdomada (Six times per week) (in the summer, with the same company, at the Bournelli Theatre)

1967–1984
A small selection of her many theatrical appearances
 Pirandello Il piacere dell'onesta' (The Pleasure of Honesty) (Yannis Fertis - Xenia Kalogeropoulou company)
 Leonard Gershe Butterflies are Free (Giannis Fertis - Xenia Kalogeropoulou company)
 Nikos Kazantzakis Zorbas (Zorba the Greek) (Yannis Voglis - Smaro Stefanidou company, directed by Nikos Charalambous)
Julia (Aliki Vougiouklaki company)
 Alexandre Dumas La Dame aux Camélias (Aliki Vougiouklaki company, directed by Mauro Bolognini)
Hit (Dimitris Horn company, Kappa theatre)
 Euripides The Trojan Women (translated and directed by Yannis Tsarouchis at the Kaplanon Street Theatre - in the role of Hecuba)
 Giannis Dalianidis Ikosi yinekes ki ego (Twenty Women and I (Kostas Voutsas Company)
 Robert Thomas Huit Femmes (Eight Women) (Kalouta Theatre)
 Leonard Gershe The Ship of Fools (Bournelli Theatre)
 Alexej Galin Retro (Titos Vandis Company, Broadway Theatre, 1984)
 Françoise Sagan Bonheur, impair et passe (Christos Politis - Andonis Andypas Company, at the Simple Theatre)

Films

Television

Theatrical plays on television

Dimitris Psathas: "The coward and the brave" (1977) ..... Edim Bilingli
Dimitris Psathas: "Dumb and dumber" (1986) ..... Theodora
"Never lose faith"
etc.

Television series

Dimitris Nikolaidis: The mister, the mistress and the mama
Yannis Tziotis: Love stories
"The last grandchildren" (based on a novel by Tasos Athanasiadis)
Giorgos Konstantinou: "All four of them were wonderful"

Radio
She took part, for a great number of years, in many theatrical and literary radio shows, as well as in radio serials such as:
"The tongue that embroiders" and
"Baroness Staff".
She read, in installments, the novels:
A hundred years of solitude by Gabriel Garcia Marquez,
The third wreath by Kostas Tachtsis,
The decadence of the hard ones by Anghelos Terzakis

References

External links

1913 births
2010 deaths
Actresses from Athens
Burials in Athens